Baykal is a village in Bolotninsky District of Novosibirsk Oblast, Russia. Population:

References 

Rural localities in Novosibirsk Oblast